Victor Franco (1930 in Baghdad – 18 February 2018) was a French journalist who was awarded the 1963 Albert Londres Prize for La Révolution sensuelle. He died in Montélimar on 18 February 2018 at the age of 87.

References

External links 
 Victor Franco on the site of Éditions Grasset

1930 births
2018 deaths
People from Baghdad
20th-century French journalists
21st-century French journalists
Albert Londres Prize recipients